Semya i Shkola (Family and School) was a Russian magazine published in Saint Petersburg in 1871–1888. Founded by writer Elena Apreleva and natural scientist Yulian Simashko, and appealing to both to parents and children, it is considered to be the first serious pedagogical publication in Russia.

The Soviet magazine of the same title founded in 1946 originally distanced itself from its pre-1917 predecessor, but in the latter years was keen to emphasize the lineage.

References

1871 establishments in the Russian Empire
1888 disestablishments in the Russian Empire
Defunct literary magazines published in Europe
Defunct magazines published in Russia
Magazines established in 1871
Magazines disestablished in 1888
Magazines published in Saint Petersburg
Russian-language magazines
Literary magazines published in Russia
Weekly magazines published in Russia